Rafael Pujals Cárdenas (ca. 1830 – 23 April 1889) was a late 19th-century Puerto Rican physician practicing in Ponce, Puerto Rico, that excelled as a civic leader.

Physician
Pujals Cárdenas was born in Humacao, Puerto Rico, and graduated from the University of Barcelona, Spain. He was the first physician with a medical degree title in Ponce, becoming the first medical doctor on the staff at Hospital de Damas, where he worked without pay. He later became the first medical director of Hospital Tricoche.

In addition to his private medical practice, Dr. Pujals was also the physician for the famed Ponce Municipal Fire Corps in the last quarter of the 19th century.

Civic leader
Pujals also excelled as a civic leader and on 30 June 1877, he became the first director of the reorganized Gabinete Ponceño de Lectura (Ponce Reading Cabinet), an early version of today's Ponce Public Library. In 1886, he was also one of the nine cosigners of El Plan de Ponce that Roman Baldorioty de Castro had championed seeking greater political autonomy for Puerto Rico. He was also an active participant at the Grito de Lares.

Death
Pujals died in Ponce on 23 April 1889, victim of an asystole.

Legacy
The government of Puerto Rico honored Dr. Pujals naming a school in Ponce after him. He is also recognized for his contributions in civic duty at the Ponce Park for the Illustrious Ponce Citizens.

See also

 Ponce, Puerto Rico
 List of Puerto Ricans

References

Notes

People from Humacao, Puerto Rico
1810 births
Physicians from Ponce
1889 deaths
University of Barcelona alumni